Rufus William Franklin (1916-1975) was an American criminal who served a life sentence in Alcatraz. He is best known for taking part in the third documented attempted  escape from Alcatraz Prison with Thomas R. Limerick and James C. Lucas on the night of May 23, 1938.

Biography
 
He was born in Alabama, in either Calhoun, Jefferson or Montgomery Counties. Franklin was originally sentenced to imprisonment for bank robbery, car theft, and assault. He was then transferred to Alcatraz, where he became inmate number 335-AZ.

Alcatraz escape attempt
In the spring of 1938, Franklin, Thomas R. Limerick and James C. Lucas planned an escape from Alcatraz. Their escape plan began by incapacitating an unarmed guard supervising a work detail on the top floor. Once the supervisor was rendered unconscious, the convicts would escape through a window to the rooftop, where they would incapacitate an armed guard and leave the island via a seized police boat. They enacted their escape plan on May 23, 1938 in the prison's mat shop, where they assaulted Custodial Officer Royal Cline with hammer blows to his head. They proceeded to the roof, where an armed guard shot both Franklin and Limerick, although Lucas wasn't shot. Other guards arrived at the scene. Franklin, Limerick, and Lucas were cornered and surrendered to the guards.

Cline died of his injuries the next day, as did Limerick. 
Franklin and Lucas, the other surviving convict, were tried for murder and sentenced to life imprisonment, after the jury spared them from execution. Franklin spent many years of solitary confinement in Alcatraz's D Block. He was eventually transferred to the Atlanta federal prison where he was paroled in 1974. Franklin died a year later.

See also 
List of Alcatraz escape attempts

References

External links 
Alcatraz Archive
Escapes from Alcatraz
Alcatraz History, 3rd Escape Attempt

1916 births
1975 deaths
Inmates of Alcatraz Federal Penitentiary
American bank robbers
American people convicted of murder
People convicted of murder by the United States federal government
American prisoners sentenced to life imprisonment
Prisoners sentenced to life imprisonment by the United States federal government
People convicted of robbery
American people convicted of assault
People paroled from life sentence